Perimede is a genus of moths in the family Cosmopterigidae.

Species
Perimede annulata Busck, 1914
Perimede battis Hodges, 1962
Perimede catapasta Walsingham, 1909
Perimede circitor Hodges, 1969
Perimede citeriella Sinev, 1986   
Perimede decimanella Sinev, 1986
Perimede erema Hodges, 1969
Perimede erransella Chambers, 1874
Perimede falcata Braun, 1919
Perimede grandis Hodges, 1978
Perimede latris Hodges, 1962
Perimede maniola Hodges, 1969
Perimede parilis Hodges, 1969
Perimede purpurescens Forbes, 1931
Perimede ricina Hodges, 1962

References
Natural History Museum Lepidoptera genus database

Chrysopeleiinae